There are fourteen vice-presidents of the European Parliament who sit in for the president in presiding over the plenary of the European Parliament.

Role
Vice-presidents are members of the Bureau and chair the plenary when the president is not in the chair. The president may also delegate any duty, task or power to one of the vice-presidents. Three vice-presidents, designated by the Conference of Presidents, traditionally have more power than the others; the right to be on the conciliation committee.

Election
The vice-presidents are elected following the election of the president, which takes place every two and a half years or when necessary if positions become vacant.

6th parliament

30 July 2004 to 16 January 2007
Elected (unopposed) in order of precedence;

16 January 2007 to 14 July 2009
Elected (unopposed) in order of precedence;

7th parliament

14 July 2009 to 17 January 2012 
Elected in order of precedence;

17 January 2012 to 1 July 2014
Elected in order of precedence;

8th parliament

1 July 2014 to 18 January 2017
Elected in order of precedence;

18 January 2017 to 3 July 2019
Elected in order of precedence;

9th Parliament 

3 July 2019 to 18 January 2022
Elected in order of precedence;

18 January 2022 to present
Elected in order of precedence;

References

External links
 Rules of Procedures, Rule 14: Election of Vice-presidents
 Rules of Procedures, Rule 20: Duties of Vice-presidents

European Parliament
Legislative deputy speakers